Alfred August Jochim  (June 12, 1902 – March 17, 1980) was an American gymnast. He was born in Berlin and died in Lodi, New Jersey. He won two Silver medals in the Gymnastics at the 1932 Summer Olympics in Los Angeles.

References

External links
 Profile of Al Jochim at Sports Reference

1902 births
1980 deaths
Gymnasts from Berlin
American male artistic gymnasts
Olympic silver medalists for the United States in gymnastics
Gymnasts at the 1924 Summer Olympics
Gymnasts at the 1928 Summer Olympics
Gymnasts at the 1932 Summer Olympics
Gymnasts at the 1936 Summer Olympics
Medalists at the 1932 Summer Olympics
20th-century American people